Phoenix Assurance or Phoenix Fire Office was a fire insurance company founded in 1680 in England.

The history of the company includes the nostalgia of red-coated attendants clattering to the fires of London on horse-drawn tenders.

The Phoenix figured in Case Law. In 1796, the company refused to pay damages awarded of £3,000 (2011: £) following a 1792 fire at a house in Tavistock Street, London. Phoenix claimed that the owners had failed to obtain a Certificate from the ministers and churchwardens of the parish affirming the good character of the victims. Phoenix issued a Writ of Error to appeal against the original decision.

Phoenix diversified into life insurance, establishing the Pelican Life Office in 1797. In 1907 Phoenix reabsorbed Pelican Life Assurance, at that time known as the Pelican and British Empire Life Office, becoming a composite insurer.

Sun Alliance & London acquired Phoenix Assurance in 1984.

References

External links
 Phoenix Assurance Company: Records and Papers at Cambridge University Library

Financial services companies established in 1680
Financial services companies established in the 17th century
Defunct fire and rescue services of England
Insurance companies of the United Kingdom
Organizations established in the 1680s
1680 establishments in England